Legette is a surname. Notable people with the surname include:

Burnie Legette (born 1970), American football player
Tyrone Legette (born 1970), American football player

See also
Felisha Legette-Jack (born 1966), American women's basketball player and coach